Minuscule 804 (in the Gregory-Aland numbering), ε614 (von Soden), is a Greek minuscule manuscript of the New Testament written on parchment. Palaeographically it has been assigned to the 11th century. The manuscript is lacunose.

Description 
The codex contains the text of the four Gospels, on 261 parchment leaves (size ), with one lacuna at the end (John 15:19-21:25).

The text is written in one column per page, 23 lines per page.

There is also another division according to the smaller Ammonian Sections (in Mark 235 sections, the last in 16:10), with references to the Eusebian Canons.

Text 
Aland did not place the Greek text of the codex in any Category.

According to the Claremont Profile Method it represents Kx in Luke 1 and mixed Byzantine text in Luke 20. In Luke 10 no profile was made.

History 
According to C. R. Gregory the manuscript was written in the 12th century. The manuscript is currently dated by the INTF to the 11th century.

It was added to the list of New Testament manuscripts by Gregory (804e). Gregory saw the manuscript in 1886.

The manuscript is now housed at the library of the Hellenic Parliament (2) in Athens.

See also 

 List of New Testament minuscules
 Biblical manuscript
 Textual criticism
 Minuscule 805

References

Further reading

External links 
 Online images of minuscule 804 (Digital) at the CSNTM.

Greek New Testament minuscules
11th-century biblical manuscripts